In mathematics, the term large set is sometimes used to refer to any set that is "large" in some sense. It has specialized meanings in three branches of mathematics:

Large set (category theory), a set that does not belong to a fixed universe of sets
Large set (combinatorics), a set of integers whose sum of reciprocals diverges
Large set (Ramsey theory), a set of integers with the property that, if all the integers are colored, one of the color classes has long arithmetic progressions whose differences are in the set

See also
Natural density
Small set (disambiguation)